The 15713 / 14 Katihar - Patna Junction Intercity Express is an Express train belonging to Indian Railways Northeast Frontier Railway zone that runs between  and  in India.

References

External links
15713 Intercity Express at India Rail Info
15714 Intercity Express at India Rail Info

Intercity Express (Indian Railways) trains
Transport in Katihar
Rail transport in Bihar
Transport in Patna